Viktor Vasilyevich Zimin (born March 4, 1950) is a Russian professional football coach. Currently, he is an assistant coach with FC Dynamo Bryansk.

Zimin has been the interim manager of Dynamo Bryansk's senior squad on several occasions, most recently following the dismissal of Andrey Chernyshov in June 2008.

References

1950 births
Living people
Soviet footballers
Soviet football managers
Russian football managers
Association footballers not categorized by position